Eugene F. Gibson (19242007) coached the Texas Tech Red Raiders men's basketball team from 1961 to 1969. A former all-conference player for Texas Tech, during his first year as coach, he led the team to the second round of the NCAA tournament. He completed his coaching career with a record of 101–91 and the third-most conference victories in Tech's history.

Gibson died on May 26, 2007, in Plano, Texas.

References

1924 births
2007 deaths
Texas Tech Red Raiders basketball coaches
Texas Tech Red Raiders basketball players
American men's basketball coaches
American men's basketball players